Huey Long may refer to:

Huey Long (1893–1935), American politician
Huey Long (singer) (1904–2009), American jazz singer and musician with The Ink Spots

See also
Huey Long (Keck), a 1941 sculpture of the politician by Charles Keck
Huey Long (film), a 1985 documentary film on the politician